Sandon Stolle and Cyril Suk were the defending champions, but Stolle competed with Wayne Black, while Suk competed with Donald Johnson this year. Suk and Johnson were defeated by Stolle and Black in the third round, while Stolle and Black were defeated by Andrei Olhovskiy and David Prinosil in the quarterfinals.

Alex O'Brien and Sébastien Lareau won the title, defeating Indian first seeds Mahesh Bhupathi and Leander Paes in the final, 7–6(9–7), 6–4.

Seeds

Qualifying draw

Draw

Finals

Top half

Section 1

Section 2

Bottom half

Section 3

Section 4

External links
Main draw
1999 US Open – Men's draws and results at the International Tennis Federation

Mens Doubles, 1999
US Open (tennis) by year – Men's doubles